Events in the year 2023 in Cambodia.

Incumbents

Events 
Ongoing  COVID-19 pandemic in Cambodia

 1 January – Dr. Kao Kim Hourn succeeded Lim Jock Hoi as the new Secretary-General of ASEAN, becoming the first Cambodian to hold the post.
 9 January – Prime Minister: Hun Sen says that the government might make further amendments to country’s Constitution that will expend the 2021 dual citizens ban.
 12 February – Cambodian prime minister Hun Sen orders the closure of one of the country's last independent news outlets, saying that its publications have hurt him and his son Hun Manet.
 20 February – British authorities repatriate 77 pieces of Khmer jewellery from indicted art trafficker Douglas Latchford's family to the Ministry of Culture and Fine Arts of Cambodia. 
 24 February – Cambodia's Ministry of Health reports 12 more suspected cases of H5N1 influenza in Prey Veng province following the death of a 12-year-old girl, the first confirmed death from the virus since 2014. 
 3 March – A court in Phnom Penh, sentences opposition figure Kem Sokha to 27 years in prison on charges of "collusion with foreigners" and treason.

Predicted and scheduled events 

 5 – 17 May – 2023 Southeast Asian Games in Phnom Penh, Cambodia.
 23 July – 2023 Cambodian general election.

References 

 
Cambodia
Cambodia
2020s in Cambodia
Years of the 21st century in Cambodia